Anna Unger (born 2 May, 1944)  is a former East German cross-country skier who competed in the late 1960s and early 1970s. She earned a silver medal in the 3 × 5 km relay at the 1970 FIS Nordic World Ski Championships in Vysoké Tatry.

Cross-country skiing results

Olympic Games

World Championships
 1 medal – (1 silver)

External links
World Championship results 

German female cross-country skiers
Living people
FIS Nordic World Ski Championships medalists in cross-country skiing
1944 births